Rajendra Devlekar (1966 - 22 September 2020) was a Shiv Sena politician from Thane district, Maharashtra. He was Mayor of Kalyan-Dombivali Municipal Corporation.

Devlekar was diagnosed with COVID-19  in August 2020, during the COVID-19 pandemic in India. He was moved to Mumbai for more intensive treatment after his health deteriorated further. He later died there of the disease. He is survived by his wife and two daughters.

Positions held
 2010: Elected as corporator in Kalyan-Dombivali Municipal Corporation
 2015: Re-elected as corporator in Kalyan-Dombivali Municipal Corporation
 2015: Elected as Mayor of Kalyan-Dombivali Municipal Corporation

References

External links
 Shivsena Home Page
 kdmc.gov.in

Mayors of places in Maharashtra
People from Kalyan-Dombivli
2020 deaths
Deaths from the COVID-19 pandemic in India
Marathi politicians
Shiv Sena politicians
People from Thane district
Maharashtra local politicians
1966 births